Judith is the tenth studio album by American singer and songwriter Judy Collins, released in 1975 by Elektra Records in both stereo (7E-1032) and CD-4 quadraphonic (EQ-1032) versions. Collins recorded Judith three years after her precedent album True Stories and Other Dreams, having been focused during the interim on producing Antonia: a Portrait of the Woman a documentary about Antonia Brico.

Peaking at No. 17 on the Billboard Pop Albums chart, Judith became Collins' best-selling studio album to date: certified Gold by the RIAA in 1975, for sales of over 500,000 copies, Judith would be certified Platinum in 1996, for sales of over 1,000,000 copies.

Collins received a Grammy Award nomination for Best Pop Vocal Performance, Female for her cover of Stephen Sondheim's "Send in the Clowns". Sondheim won the Grammy Award for Song of the Year that same year, based on the popularity of Collins' performance of the song on this album. The single peaked at No. 36 on Billboard's Pop singles chart in 1975, and then reentered the chart in 1977, reaching No. 19; it spent a total of 27 non-consecutive weeks on this chart.

The album also includes material by Steve Goodman, Danny O'Keefe, Wendy Waldman, Jimmy Webb, the Rolling Stones, and the 1930s standard "Brother, Can You Spare a Dime?", as well as three of Collins' own compositions- "Houses", "Song for Duke", and "Born to the Breed".

Track listing
 "The Moon Is a Harsh Mistress" (Jimmy Webb) – 2:59
 "Angel Spread Your Wings" (Danny O'Keefe) – 3:05
 "Houses" (Judy Collins) – 4:32
 "The Lovin' of the Game" (Pat Garvey) – 3:03
 "Song for Duke" (Judy Collins) – 3:33
 "Send in the Clowns" (Stephen Sondheim) – 3:57
 "Salt of the Earth" (Mick Jagger, Keith Richards) – 3:59
 "Brother, Can You Spare a Dime?" (E.Y. "Yip" Harburg, Jay Gorney) – 3:13
 "City of New Orleans" (Steve Goodman) – 4:07
 "I'll Be Seeing You" (Sammy Fain, Irving Kahal) – 3:44
 "Pirate Ships" (Wendy Waldman) – 2:42
 "Born to the Breed" (Judy Collins) – 4:45

Personnel
Judy Collins – vocals, guitar, piano
George Marge – English horn, flute, recorder
Bill Slapin - alto flute
Romeo Penque – flute, bass flute
Emanuel Vardi - viola
Gene Orloff – violin
Kenny Ascher – electric piano
Hugh McCracken, David Spinozza, Steve Burgh, Charlie Brown, Steve Goodman – guitar
Tony Levin – bass
Steve Gadd – drums
Ralph MacDonald – percussion
Kenneth Bichel – ARP synthesizer 
Eric Weissberg – bass, guitar, steel guitar, dobro
Pat Rebillot, Paul Griffin – organ, electric piano
 Don Brooks – harmonica
Arthur Clarke, Seldon Powell, Tony Studd, Frank Wess, Randy Brecker, Garnett Brown - horns
Steve Goodman, Denver Collins, Cissy Houston, Sylvia Shemwell, Eunice Peterson, Eric Weissberg - background vocals
Corky Hale – harmonica, harp
Dom Cortes – accordion
George Ricci – cello
and many more

Production notes
Arif Mardin – producer
Jonathan Tunick – arranger, conductor ("Houses", "Send in the Clowns" and "I'll Be Seeing You")
Arif Mardin – arranger, conductor (remaining songs)
Phil Ramone – recording engineer
Glenn Berger – assistant recording engineer
Glen Christensen – art direction
David Larkham, Ron Wong– design
Francesco Scavullo – photography

Sources
[ Judith at allmusic.com]
Judy Collins Original Elektra Releases

References

1975 albums
Judy Collins albums
Albums produced by Arif Mardin
Elektra Records albums